Henriëtte Johanna Reuchlin-Lucardie (1877-1970) was a Dutch painter.

Biography 
Reuchlin-Lucardie née Lucardie was born on 28 April 1877 in Rotterdam. She studied at the Willem de Kooning Academy  in Rotterdam.

In 1930 she had a solo exhibition at the Stedelijk Museum Amsterdam.

Her work was included in the 1939 exhibition and sale Onze Kunst van Heden (Our Art of Today) at the Rijksmuseum in Amsterdam. She was a member of the Arti et Amicitiae, and the Rotterdamsche Kunstenaars-Sociëteit.

Reuchlin-Lucardie died on 22 September 1970 in Rotterdam. Her work is in the Centraal Museum, Utrecht.

References

External links
images of Reuchlin-Lucardie's work at Invaluable

1877 births
1970 deaths
Artists from Rotterdam
20th-century Dutch women artists